APT40 (also known as BRONZE MOHAWK (by Secureworks), FEVERDREAM, G0065, Gadolinium (by Microsoft), GreenCrash, Hellsing (by Kaspersky), Kryptonite Panda (by Crowdstrike), Leviathan (by Proofpoint), MUDCARP, Periscope, Temp.Periscope, and Temp.Jumper) is an advanced persistent threat located in Haikou, Hainan Province, People's Republic of China (PRC), and has been active since at least 2009. APT40 has targeted governmental organizations, companies, and universities in a wide range of industries, including biomedical, robotics, and maritime research, across the United States, Canada, Europe, the Middle East, and the South China Sea area, as well as industries included in China's Belt and Road Initiative.

APT40 is closely connected to Hafnium.

Indictment 
On July 19, 2021, the U.S. Department of Justice (DOJ) unsealed an indictment against four APT40 cyber actors for their illicit computer network exploitation activities via front company Hainan Xiandun Technology Development Company.

See also 

 Cyberwarfare by China
 Red Apollo

References 

Chinese advanced persistent threat groups
Espionage
Hacking (computer security)
Cyberwarfare